In enzymology, a dCTP deaminase (dUMP-forming) is an enzyme that catalyzes the chemical reaction

dCTP + 2 H2O  dUMP + diphosphate + NH3

Thus, the two substrates of this enzyme are dCTP and H2O, whereas its 3 products are dUMP, diphosphate, and NH3.

This enzyme belongs to the family of hydrolases, those acting on carbon-nitrogen bonds other than peptide bonds, specifically in cyclic amidines.  The systematic name of this enzyme class is dCTP aminohydrolase (dUMP-forming). This enzyme participates in pyrimidine metabolism.

Structural studies

References

 

EC 3.5.4
Enzymes of known structure